Hans Nicolajsen, known as John Nicolayson (1803 in Løgumkloster – 1856 in Jerusalem) was a Danish missionary to Palestine for the London Society for Promoting Christianity Among the Jews. He was in effect the first representative of the British Christian mission to Jews in Palestine. He was one of those who appealed against the Damascus affair, and was founder of Christ Church, Jerusalem, and Mount Zion Cemetery, Jerusalem as predecessor of Michael Alexander (bishop).

References

Danish Anglican missionaries
1803 births
1856 deaths
Burials at Mount Zion (Protestant)
Anglican missionaries in Palestine (region)
Anglican missionaries in the Ottoman Empire
People from Tønder Municipality